Cyperus nemoralis is a species of sedge that is endemic to central Madagascar.

The species was first formally described by the botanist Henri Chermezon in 1921.

See also
 List of Cyperus species

References

nemoralis
Taxa named by Henri Chermezon
Endemic flora of Madagascar
Plants described in 1921